Schönberger is a surname. Notable people with the surname include:

 Alan Schoenberger (born 1989, Brisbane, Australia), Australian infielder

 (Benjamin) "Benno" Schönberger (1863, Vienna - 1930, Wisborough Green, Sussex), Austrian Jewish pianist of Hungarian descent

 Heinz Schönberger (born 1926, Frankfurt/Main), German jazz musician and orchestra leader
 Jenő Schönberger (born 1959, Turulung), Hungarian-Romanian Roman Catholic bishop (Roman Catholic Diocese of Satu Mare)
 Margaret Schönberger Mahler, née Schönberger (1897–1985, Sopron - 1985), Jewish Hungarian physician

 Noémi Ban (born 1922), born: Noémi Schönberger, Jewish Hungarian-American lecturer, public speaker, and teacher
 Otto Schönberger (born 1926, Dillingen an der Donau), German classical philologist

 Sandro Schönberger (born 1987, Weiden in der Oberpfalz), German ice hockey player

 Thomas Schönberger (born 1986, Graz), Austrian football player

See also 
 Schönberger Land
 Niendorf/Amt Schönberger Land
 Schönberg (disambiguation)
 Schöneberger

References 

German-language surnames
Jewish surnames